Kuching Bypass, consisting of Jalan Datu Bandar Mustapha, Jalan Tun Jugah and Jalan Tun Razak, Federal Route 801, is a major highway in Kuching city, Sarawak, Malaysia.

List of interchanges and intersections 

Highways in Malaysia
Malaysian Federal Roads